Augustus Peter Arkwright (2 March 1821 – 6 October 1887) was a Royal Navy officer and a Conservative Party politician who sat in the House of Commons from 1868 to 1880.

Arkwright was the seventh son of Peter Arkwright J.P. of Rock House, near Matlock, and his wife Mary Anne Hurt, daughter of Charles Hurt. He was the grandson of Richard Arkwright Junior. Between 1829 and 1832, he was educated at Seaforth near Liverpool and in 1833 at the age of 12 went to Portsmouth Naval College. He left there in June 1835 and joined HMS Barham at the age of 14. He also served on HMS Curacoa and HMS Stag. He passed his examination to become mate/sub lieutenant on 14 October 1840 and served as mate on HMS Pantaloon on the Africa, Mediterranean, and Home stations and on the survey ship HMS Bonetta. He obtained his lieutenant's commission on 6 February 1845 and served on HMS Trafalgar and HMS Caledonia. He became a commander on 23 June 1859 and retired as commander on 23 June 1869, becoming captain on the Retired List on 23 June 1874.

In May 1852 Arkwright was a passenger on the SS Great Britain, travelling between Liverpool and New York.

Arkwright lived at Willersley Castle, Matlock and became a partner in Agra Bank Limited. He was elected at the 1868 general election as one of the two Members of Parliament (MPs) for North Derbyshire,
and held the seat until his defeat at the 1880 general election.

References

External links 
 
 

1821 births
1887 deaths
People from Matlock, Derbyshire
Royal Navy officers
Conservative Party (UK) MPs for English constituencies
UK MPs 1868–1874
UK MPs 1874–1880
19th-century Royal Navy personnel